David Mills,  (March 18, 1831 – May 8, 1903) was a Canadian politician, author, poet and puisne justice of the Supreme Court of Canada.

He was born in Palmyra, in southwestern Upper Canada (now Ontario). His father, Nathaniel Mills, was one of the first settlers in the area. Mills served as superintendent of schools for Kent County from 1856 to 1865.  He then attended the University of Michigan School of law, graduating with honors in 1867 with an LL.B degree.

He published The Present and Future Political Aspects of Canada in 1860 and The Blunders of the Dominion Government in connection with the North-West Territory in 1871.

Mills was first elected to the House of Commons of Canada as a Liberal Member of Parliament (MP) in the 1867 federal election and re-elected in four subsequent votes until being defeated in the 1882 election. He was an opponent of dual representation (the practice in which someone could simultaneously be a member of parliament as well as a member of the Ontario or Quebec legislature. He unsuccessfully introduced a private member's bill to abolish this practice, and continued to advocate for this until it was abolished in 1873.

He returned to Parliament through an 1884 by-election. He was re-elected in subsequent elections until his defeat in the 1896 election despite this being the election that brought the Liberals back to power.

He served as Minister of the Interior in the Cabinet of Alexander Mackenzie from 1876 to 1878.  Sir Wilfrid Laurier appointed Mills to the Senate of Canada after he lost his Commons seat in 1896, and appointed him to Cabinet as Minister of Justice and Leader of the Government in the Canadian Senate. He resigned from the Senate and Cabinet in 1902. He was appointed to the Supreme Court of Canada on February 8, 1902, and served on the Court for one year until his death in 1903.

References

Selected poetry of David Mills

 Supreme Court of Canada biography

External links
 

1831 births
1903 deaths
Lawyers in Ontario
Judges in Ontario
Canadian senators from Ontario
Justices of the Supreme Court of Canada
Liberal Party of Canada MPs
Liberal Party of Canada senators
Members of the House of Commons of Canada from Ontario
Members of the King's Privy Council for Canada
Persons of National Historic Significance (Canada)
University of Michigan Law School alumni